Roger Winston Yuan (born January 25, 1961) is an American martial arts fight trainer, stunt coordinator / performer, and actor who has trained many actors and actresses in many Hollywood films. As an actor himself, he also appeared in Shanghai Noon (2000) opposite Jackie Chan, Bulletproof Monk (2003) alongside Chow Yun-fat, the technician in Batman Begins (2005), and as Sévérine's bodyguard in Skyfall (2012). He is a well-recognized choreographer in Hollywood.

Early life
Yuan was born in Carbondale, Illinois to Theresa and Roger Yuan, and is the older brother of Ron Yuan. He is a U.S.A black belt in Chun Kuk Do. He is also a member of The United Fighting Arts Federation (UFAF). His first stunt double stint came in the 1986 film House.

Career
As of 2017, Yuan has performed stunts in over 30 films, such as: Rapid Fire, Escape from L.A., Beverly Hills Ninja, Spawn, Blade and also Warcraft and Jason Bourne. In 2011, he trained Jennifer Lawrence and Jason Flemyng in X-Men: First Class as well as Henry Cavill in Immortals. He also trained Keanu Reeves in 47 Ronin.

Yuan's first role as a professional actor is in The Perfect Weapon (1991), Yuan's first credited acting debut is in Red Corner (1997), alongside Richard Gere. He also appeared in Lethal Weapon 4, which is Jet Li's American film debut, as the role of Chu, a Chinese Triad gangster. In 2000, he played the main antagonist in the action-comedy Shanghai Noon alongside Jackie Chan, as the corrupt Imperial Guard Lo Fong, the role helped him become popular with audiences. In 2003, he appeared in the beginning of Bulletproof Monk, playing Chow Yun-fat's master. In Batman Begins, he appeared as the Hazmat Technician alongside Gary Oldman and as the Chinese Engineer in Syriana. In Skyfall, he also trained Daniel Craig and had a role as the Severine's bodyguard. Yuan also appeared in many TV Shows, he appeared in Walker Texas Ranger, playing different characters, and his most famous role is that of Lazarus in the episodes 'The Winds of Change' and 'Lazarus'.

For fifteen years Yuan was based in Ireland. 
In 2016, he starred in Crouching Tiger, Hidden Dragon: Sword of Destiny, the sequel of the successful 2000 film Crouching Tiger, Hidden Dragon. Besides working in the film industry, he also was invited by Country singer Tim McGraw to get him in shape for his 2012 Brothers of the Sun Tour.

Filmography

Film

Television

References

External links
 
 
 

1961 births
Living people
20th-century American male actors
21st-century American male actors
American male film actors